Skywhale could refer to:
 Skywhale (band) - UK 1970s Progressive Rock group
 Skywhales - a 1983 animated short film 
 The Skywhale - a hot air balloon designed by the artist Patricia Piccinini
 Theoretical living creatures developed as part of the Aurelia and Blue Moon project
 AWWA Skywhale, a concept airliner by designer Oscar Viñals of Spain